The Chief Secretary Punjab, also referred to as CS Punjab, is the bureaucratic chief and highest-ranking official of the Government of Punjab, Pakistan. The appointment of the Chief Secretary is made directly by the Prime Minister of Pakistan. The position of Chief Secretary is equivalent to the rank of Federal Secretary and the position holder usually belongs to the Pakistan Administrative Service.

The Chief Secretary is the province's administrative boss as all the divisional commissioners and administrative secretaries of the province report to him. The CS in return reports to the Chief Minister of Punjab, however the Chief Secretary is not under the charge of the Chief Minister as only the Prime Minister can appoint or remove the CS from his position. The Chief Secretary also serves as the Chief Advisor to the Chief Minister and as Secretary to the provincial Cabinet. He is assisted by Additional Chief secretary (ACS) Punjab.

List of Chief Secretaries
The following table lists down the names of chief secretaries that have remained in office since December 2003.

See also
 Federal Secretary
 Pakistan Administrative Service
 Establishment Secretary of Pakistan
 Cabinet Secretary of Pakistan
 Chief Secretary Sindh
 Chief Secretary Balochistan
 Chief Secretary Khyber Pakhtunkhwa
 Chief Secretary (Pakistan)
 Deputy commissioner

References

Government of Punjab, Pakistan
Pakistani government officials